Senator Hogg may refer to:

Rob Hogg (born 1967), Iowa State Senate
Robert Lynn Hogg (1893–1973), West Virginia State Senate

See also
Senator Hogue (disambiguation)